Southern Artery is a street in Quincy, Massachusetts. For much of its length it is a major arterial street which is used by an average of over 30,000 Boston area commuters daily.

Route description
Route 3A enters Quincy from the south at Weymouth Fore River onto Washington Street. Northbound on 3A, as Washington Street intersects Southern Artery, Route 3A turns north toward Dorchester and Interstate 93 along Southern Artery. In this section, Southern Artery is a heavily commercialized four lane undivided strip.

Among points of interest in this area is the Souther Tide Mill near the west end of Town River Bay. Built in 1806, the tide mill was partly owned by the Adams family and is the oldest surviving mill of its kind in the nation. The city of Quincy is working with preservationist groups to create a historical and recreational park at the mill. Farther north along the route is the site of the world's first Dunkin' Donuts shop, established in 1950 at 543 Southern Artery. The lot is occupied by a newer Dunkin' Donuts store which includes a small plaque inside commemorating this history.

At the end of the heavily commercialized section, Southern Artery intersects Coddington Street (south side) and Sea Street (north side) at the Quincy Police Department headquarters. Also at corners of this intersection are Quincy High School fields and Mount Wollaston Cemetery, Quincy's largest burial ground.

After crossing Coddington Street, Southern Artery passes the cemetery and into a residential area, ending at Furnace Brook Parkway. From there Route 3A continues to Hancock Street along a former stretch of Southern Artery that in 2001 was renamed the Merrymount Parkway.

For southbound Route 3A travelers reversing this trip, the drive along Southern Artery ends at the intersection with Washington Street along which Route 3A continues to Weymouth. Southern Artery in fact extends from this intersection as a two lane street south to Quincy Avenue as the initial stretch of Route 53 through a quieter residential section of Quincy Point.

History
Southern Artery was originally part of historic New England Route 6 of the New England Interstate road marking system developed in the 1920s. The section of NE6 from Jamaica Plain through Dorchester into Quincy was called Southern Artery by the Massachusetts Highway Commission. Large portions of the route retained the original street names such as Morton Street and Codman Street (now Gallivan Boulevard) through Boston along the route now designated Route 203,  as did the portion along Hancock Street in Quincy. The street called Southern Artery was newly constructed in 1926 and retains the highway name.

References

External links

Roads in Massachusetts
Quincy, Massachusetts